Henry F. Whitelock House and Farm is an historic home and farm located in Harrison Township, Henry County, Indiana. The house was built between 1836 and 1854, and is a -story, "T"-shaped vernacular Greek Revival style frame dwelling.  It sits on a brick foundation and the original section is of hand-hewn post and beam construction. A front porch was added about 1890. Also located on the farm are a summer kitchen, smoke house, garage, two barns, and a chicken house.

It was added to the National Register of Historic Places in 1983.

References

Houses on the National Register of Historic Places in Indiana
Greek Revival houses in Indiana
Houses completed in 1854
Buildings and structures in Henry County, Indiana
National Register of Historic Places in Henry County, Indiana